Thembelihle Local Municipality (formerly known as Oranje-Karoo Local Municipality) is a local municipality in the Pixley ka Seme District Municipality district of the Northern Cape province of South Africa. Thembelihle is a Xhosa name meaning "good hope".

History
At the end of the apartheid era, in the area that is today the Thembelihle Municipality, there were municipal councils for Hopetown and Strydenburg which were elected by the white residents, while the coloured residents of Steynville (Hopetown) and Strydenburg were governed by management committees subordinate to the white councils. The remaining rural areas were served by the Bo-Karoo Regional Services Council.

After the national elections of 1994 a process of local government transformation began, in which negotiations were held between the existing local authorities, political parties, and local community organisations. As a result of these negotiations, the existing local authorities were dissolved and transitional local councils (TLCs) were created for each town. The Strydenburg municipality and management committee were replaced by a TLC in September 1994, and the Hopetown municipality and Steynville management committee were replaced by a TLC in March 1995. The transitional councils were initially made up of members nominated by the various parties to the negotiations, until May 1996 when elections were held. At these elections the Bo-Karoo District Council was established, replacing the Bo-Karoo Regional Services Council. Transitional representative councils (TRCs) were also elected to represent the areas not included in the TLCs on the District Council; the area that was to become Thembelihle Municipality was part of the Oranje-Karoo TRC, except for Orania which had a separate TRC. 

At the local elections of December 2000 the TLCs and TRCs were dissolved and the Oranje-Karoo Municipality (renamed Thembelihle in June 2001) was established as a single local authority. The Orania TRC challenged its dissolution in the Kimberley High Court, and under a settlement with the provincial government this TRC retained its powers and functions indefinitely pending further negotiations. Orania residents are entitled to vote in elections for the Thembelihle council, and 21% of registered voters in Orania cast a ballot in the 2021 elections, but  they did not receive any municipal services from Thembelihle.

Geography
The principal town is Hopetown (pop. 10,259), which is situated on the Orange River. The remainder of the municipality is rural, mostly used for farming of sheep and goats while intensive irrigated agriculture occurs along the Orange River. The main transport links in the municipal area are the N12 national road and the De Aar–Kimberley railway line, both of which pass north-south through the municipality.

According to the census, the main spoken language in the municipality is Afrikaans, which is home language of 89% of residents. It is followed by isiXhosa (5%), English and Setswana (1% each). 71% of residents identified themselves as Coloured, 15% as Black African, and 13% as White. 31% of residents were under the age of 15.

Politics

The municipal council consists of eleven members elected by mixed-member proportional representation. Six councillors are elected by first-past-the-post voting in six wards, while the remaining three are chosen from party lists so that the total number of party representatives is proportional to the number of votes received. 

For most of the time since its creation in 2000 Thembelihle has been governed by the African National Congress (ANC), which won outright majorities in the 2000, 2006 and 2011 municipal elections. The opposition took control of the council in December 2011, however, after ANC lost a by-election to an independent candidate. The independent, former ANC member Danny Jonas, became the new mayor of the municipality supported by the Congress of the People and the Democratic Alliance. Jonas later joined the Economic Freedom Fighters (EFF).

In the election of 3 August 2016 the ANC regained control of the municipality, winning a majority of four seats on the council.

The following table shows the results of the 2021 election.

References

External links
 Thembelihle Local Municipality

Local municipalities of the Pixley ka Seme District Municipality